Keetia bakossiorum is a species of flowering plant in the family Rubiaceae. It is endemic to Cameroon. Its natural habitats are subtropical or tropical moist lowland forests and subtropical or tropical moist montane forests. It is threatened by habitat loss.

References

External links
World Checklist of Rubiaceae

Endemic flora of Cameroon
bakossiorum
Critically endangered plants
Taxonomy articles created by Polbot
Taxa named by Martin Cheek